Pseudomonas nitroreducens is an aerobic, Gram-negative soil bacterium first isolated from oil brine in Japan. It is able to synthesise polyhydroxybutyrate homopolymer (a polyester) from medium chain length fatty acids. Based on 16S rRNA analysis, P. nitroreducens has been placed in the P. aeruginosa group.

References

External links
Type strain of Pseudomonas nitroreducens at BacDive -  the Bacterial Diversity Metadatabase

Pseudomonadales
Bacteria described in 1964